Keshun Sherrill (born August 12, 1994) is an American professional basketball player for APU Udine of the Italian Serie A2. Standing at 175 cm (5 ft 9 in), Sherrill usually plays as combo guard. Sherrill played college basketball with Augusta University.

Professional career
On 16 July 2017, Sherrill signed with New Heroes Den Bosch of the Dutch Basketball League (DBL). On April 4, 2018, Sherrill scored a season-high 31 points in an 82–93 win over Apollo Amsterdam. In his first season, he averaged 16.4 points and 3.6 assists in 30.7 minutes per game in the regular season.

On 27 July 2018, Sherrill re-signed for a second season with Den Bosch.

On 20 August 2019, Sherrill was announced by Yalova Belediye of the Turkish Basketball First League. In 2020, he joined Kocaeli BB Kağıtspor and averaged 21.7 points, 4.1 assists, 3.9 rebounds, and 1.3 steals per game. On August 3, 2021, Sherrill signed with TED Ankara Kolejliler.

Career statistics

Domestic leagues

|-
| style="text-align:left;"| 2017–18
| style="text-align:left;"| New Heroes Den Bosch
| 33 || 30 || 30.5 || .441 || .389 || .857 || 2.2 || 3.4 || 1.2 || .2 || 16.5
|-
| style="text-align:left;"| 2018–19
| style="text-align:left;"| New Heroes Den Bosch
| 31 || 31 || 27.5 || .476 || .387 || .810 || 2.5 || 3.4 || 1.7 || .0 || 12.5
|}

References

1994 births
Living people
American expatriate basketball people in the Netherlands
American expatriate basketball people in Turkey
Augusta Jaguars men's basketball players
Basketball players from North Carolina
Heroes Den Bosch players
Dutch Basketball League players
Point guards
Shooting guards
People from Cleveland, North Carolina
American men's basketball players